See also Template:Gonville and Caius Masters.

Masters

The following have served as masters of Gonville and Caius College, Cambridge, or its forerunner, Gonville Hall.

Presidents of Fellows
The following have served as the president of Fellows of Gonville and Caius College, Cambridge from the given date.

Deans
The following have served as dean of the college.

Arthur Knight
1878 – Frederic Wallis
2005–present Rev Dr Carolyn Hammond

References

Obituary of John Venn (New York Times)
 Venn, James, Biographical History of Gonville and Caius College vol. 1 (Cambridge, 1898) p. 110 at books.google.com, accessed 27 January 2009
 Thomas Dinham Atkinson. Cambridge described & illustrated. 332 XIV. GONVILLE AND CAIUS COLLEGE.

Gonville and Caius